Gavril Kolesov (born 7 September 1979, in Dyabyla, Yakut Autonomous Soviet Socialist Republic, Soviet Union) is Russian draughts player (Russian, Brazilian and International draughts), seven time world champion in draughts-64. International grandmaster (GMI) since 1996. He graduated North-Eastern Federal University in 2001.

Sport achievements
World champion (Brazilian and Russian draughts) 1996, 1997, 2000, 2002, 2004, 2006, 2012.
European champion (Brazilian and Russian draughts) 2010 (rapid and blitz).
Russian national champion (Russian draughts) 2010 and 2012.
Winner of Salou Open Tournament 2013.

References

External links
Rating list Men on 01.01.2015//section-64

1979 births
Living people
Russian draughts players
Players of international draughts
Players of Russian draughts
Players of Brazilian draughts